The Spanish Trotter, is the national breed of trotting horse of Spain. It is reared almost exclusively in the Balearic Islands in the Mediterranean, predominantly in the island of Mallorca, but also in Menorca and Ibiza.

History 

Trotting races were held in the Balearic Islands from the latter part of the nineteenth century. Trotting horses were bred by putting local Mallorquín and Menorquín mares to imported stallions, usually of French Trotter or Orlov Trotter origin. Some Anglo-Norman mares and stallions were imported from France in about 1920. Breeding is now usually by artificial insemination with semen from French Trotter or American Standardbred stallions.

A stud-book was started in 1980, and an official breed standard was approved in 2011.

In 2005 there were approximately 15,500 horses recorded in the stud-book. About 85% of all Spanish Trotters are in the island of Mallorca.

Genetic study has found little recent influence of the Mallorquín and Menorquín on the Spanish Trotter,.despite their contribution to its early development.

Use 

The Spanish Trotter is bred for performance in trotting races. There are three hippodromes in the islands. Races are almost invariably in harness to a sulky, with the horse performing an ordinary diagonal trot; occasionally the horses may instead be raced under saddle. The fastest time for the breed over 1 kilometre is 69.15 seconds. The horses are obedient and manageable, and are also suitable for recreational riding.

References

Balearic culture
Horse breeds
Horse breeds originating in Spain